(Cristoforo Maria) Luigi Canonica (Tesserete, Canton Ticino, 9 March 1762 – Milan, 7 February 1844) was a Swiss architect and urban planner whose prominent career as an exponent of neoclassicism was spent largely in Milan and Lombardy. He was the designated architect of the short-lived Repubblica Cisalpina, and, following the fall of the Napoleonic empire, of the kings of Sardinia. In Milan he was assigned to modify Giovanni Antonio Antolini's ambitious project for the Foro Buonaparte and the Arena.

Gallery

Notes

Architects from Ticino
Swiss people of Italian descent
1844 deaths
1762 births